Indium(III) hydroxide is the chemical compound with the formula In(OH)3. Its prime use is as a precursor to indium(III) oxide, In2O3. It is sometimes found as the rare mineral dzhalindite.

Structure
Indium(III) hydroxide has a cubic structure, space group Im3, a distorted ReO3 structure.

Preparation and reactions
Neutralizing a solution containing an In3+ salt such as indium nitrate (In(NO3)3) or a solution of indium trichloride (InCl3) gives a white precipitate that on aging forms indium(III) hydroxide. A thermal decomposition of freshly prepared In(OH)3 shows the first step is the conversion of In(OH)3xH2O to cubic indium(III) hydroxide.  The precipitation of indium hydroxide was a step in the separation of indium from zincblende ore by Reich and Richter, the discoverers of indium.

Indium(III) hydroxide is amphoteric, like gallium(III) hydroxide (Ga(OH)3) and aluminium hydroxide (Al(OH)3), but is much less acidic than gallium hydroxide (Ga(OH)3), having a lower solubility in alkaline solutions than in acid solutions. It is for all intents and purposes a basic hydroxide.

Dissolving indium(III) hydroxide in strong alkali gives solutions that probably contain either four coordinate In(OH)4− or In(OH)4(H2O)−.

Reaction with acetic acid or carboxylic acids is likely to give the basic acetate or carboxylate salt, e.g. In(OH)(OOCCH3)2.

At 10 MPa pressure and 250-400 °C, indium(III) hydroxide converts to indium oxide hydroxide (InO(OH)), which has a distorted rutile structure.

Rapid decompression of samples of indium(III) hydroxide compressed at 34 GPa causes decomposition, yielding some indium metal.

Laser ablation of indium(III) hydroxide gives indium(I) hydroxide (InOH), a bent molecule with an In-O-H angle of around 132° and an In-O bond length of 201.7 pm.

References

Indium compounds
Hydroxides
Inorganic compounds